Daniel Tilton (March 30, 1763 – November 20, 1830) was one of the three first judges of the Mississippi Territory Supreme Court, and the deliverer of the first Territorial Seal of Mississippi.

Early life and education
Tilton was born in East Kingston, New Hampshire, on March 30, 1763 to David Tilton and Jane Greeley. He attended Phillips Exeter Academy in the neighboring town of Exeter, where he graduated in 1783. He attended Dartmouth College from 1786 to 1788, and graduated from Harvard College in 1790.

Career
He was appointed by President John Adams to be one of the first judges of the newly formed Mississippi Territory along with Judge Peter Bryan Bruin and William McGuire, commissioned on May 7, 1798. On his journey to Mississippi from his native New Hampshire, he was entrusted with the carrying of the first Territorial Seal of Mississippi to the territory.

Prior to becoming a judge, Tilton was not a lawyer, though he did in fact study the law, the only judge on the court appointed by Adams at the time being Judge McGuire. The fact was noted by a sitting governor of the territory, William C. C. Claiborne, who protested in a letter to Secretary of State James Madison. In 1802, Tilton abruptly resigned, sailing to Europe from New Orleans in order to engage in "commercial business", never again returning to Mississippi. He was replaced by Judge David Ker, who was appointed by President Thomas Jefferson on the recommendations of the aforementioned Governor Claiborne and James Madison.

Personal life
Tilton was married to Isabel Thompson in 1787 in East Kingston.  He died on November 20, 1830 in Deerfield, New Hampshire, at the age of 67.

References

Bibliography 
 
 
 
  
 
 
 

1763 births
1830 deaths
Dartmouth College alumni
Harvard University alumni
Phillips Exeter Academy alumni
People from Exeter, New Hampshire
Mississippi Territory judges